The Hills Run Red may refer to:

The Hills Run Red (1966 film), Italian spaghetti western
The Hills Run Red (2009 film), American horror feature